Hasubanonine is a member of the hasubanan family of alkaloids. The alkaloid with an isoquinoline substructure has the molecular formula of C21H27NO5. The enantiomer of the natural product is being studied as a potential painkiller. Hasubanonine is structurally related to the morphinan class of opioid analgesics.

The enantioselective total synthesis of (–)-hasubanonine and related natural products, (−)-runanine, (−)-delavayine, and (+)-periglaucine B were first achieved by Prof. Seth Herzon and co-workers at Yale University in 2011.

References

Alkaloids
Phenol ethers
Enones